
Neptune was the codename for a version of Microsoft Windows under development in 1999. Based on Windows 2000, it was to replace the Windows 9x series and was scheduled to be the first home consumer-oriented version of Windows built on Windows NT code.

History 

Neptune largely resembled Windows 2000, but some new features were introduced. Neptune included a logon screen similar to that later used in Windows XP. A firewall new to Neptune was later integrated into Windows XP as the Windows Firewall. Neptune also experimented with a new HTML and Win32-based user interface originally intended for Windows Me, called Activity Centers, for task-centered operations.

Only one alpha build of Neptune, 5111, was released to testers under a non-disclosure agreement, and later made its way to various beta collectors' sites and virtual museums in 2000. Other builds of Neptune are known to exist due to information in beta builds of Windows Me and Windows XP. In November 2015, a build 5111.6 disk was shown in a Microsoft Channel 9 video; version 5111 was the last build of Neptune that was sent to external testers, with the .1 or .6 after the build number stands for variant, not for compile. It is the only build of Neptune that made its way to the public. Build 5111 included Activity Centers, which could be installed by copying ACCORE.DLL from the installation disk to the hard drive and then running regsvr32 on ACCORE.DLL. The centers contained traces of Windows Me, then code-named Millennium, but were broken due to JavaScript errors, missing links and executables to the Game, Photo, and Music Centers. In response, some Windows enthusiasts have spent years fixing Activity Centers in build 5111 close to what Microsoft intended.

In early 2000, Microsoft merged the team working on Neptune with that developing Odyssey, the successor to Windows 2000 for business customers. The combined team worked on a new project codenamed Whistler, which was released at the end of 2001 as Windows XP. In the meantime, Microsoft released Windows Me in 2000 as their final 9x series installment. Some development builds of Whistler feature an improved version of the logon screen found in Neptune build 5111.

In the early roadmap for Neptune's development (shown in the 1998–2001 United States v. Microsoft Corp. documents) there were five service packs planned. Also in these documents, it shows that Neptune was to have a successor named Triton which would be a minor update with very few user interface changes, and service packs were planned for it. Internally, the project's name was capitalized as NepTune.

See also
List of Microsoft codenames

References

Neptune